A hacker is a highly skilled computer expert, including:
 Security hacker, someone who seeks and exploits weaknesses in a computer system or computer network

Hacker may also refer to:

Computing and technology
 Hacker culture, a computer programmer and security hacker subculture focused on intellectual and creative aspects of hacking
 HackerNest, a nonprofit organization and movement that builds local technology communities worldwide

People
 Hacker (surname), includes a list of people with the name
 Michael Amato or The Hacker (born 1972), French electrocrash and tech producer

Arts, media, and entertainment

Fictional characters
 Hacker, cyborg sidekick character in TV series The Centurions
 Hacker T. Dog, puppet character on Scoop and CBBC links
Hacker Republic, Lisbeth Salander aka Wasp, Plague, and Trinity, hacker friends and colleagues in the series which includes The Girl who Kicked the Hornet's Nest
 Jim Hacker, title character in Yes Minister and Yes Prime Minister
 Staff Sergeant Hacker, a character on the US TV series Gomer Pyle, U.S.M.C.
 The Nameless Hacker, the main protagonist of the game System Shock (1994)
 The Hacker, a character on the US TV series Cyberchase

Films
 Hacker (film), a 2016 crime thriller
 Hackers (film), 1995 MGM film starring Jonny Lee Miller and Angelina Jolie
Hackers: Wizards of the Electronic Age, a 1985 video documentary inspired by Stephen Levy's 1984 book

Games
 Hacker (card game), 1992 Steve Jackson Games release
 Hacker (video game), 1985 puzzle/strategy computer game by Activision
 Hackers (video game), 2016 strategy video game by Trickster Arts

Literature
 Hacker, a children's novel by Malorie Blackman
 Hackers (anthology), a 1996 anthology of short stories edited by Jack Dann and Gardner Dozois
 Hackers: Heroes of the Computer Revolution, a 1984 book by Stephen Levy

Music
 "Hacker", a song on Death Grips's 2012 album The Money Store
 "The Hacker", a song by British industrial group Clock DVA

Brands and enterprises
 Hacker Brewery, and its beer, since 1972 merged into Hacker-Pschorr Brewery
 Hacker Radio Ltd, a British manufacturer of consumer electronics products
 Hacker-Craft, boats made by the Hacker Boat Company

See also

Hack (disambiguation)
Hacking (disambiguation)
Hacks (disambiguation)
Haka (disambiguation)
Hakka (disambiguation)

fi:Hakkeri